High Heat is a Mexican drama streaming television series created by José Ignacio Valenzuela, previously responsible for the series Who Killed Sara? The series premiered worldwide on Netflix on August 17, 2022.

Plot 
Poncho, who wants to investigate his brother's murder more thoroughly, sets out to find the culprit and seek justice. His trail leads to a fire station in a Mexico City neighborhood. He infiltrates the fire station undercover and begins his investigation while going about his daily work as a firefighter, with all the risks. One of his colleagues is Olivia, the only female firefighter at the station, who joins him in his search for the truth after finding out Poncho's true intentions. At the same time, the prison sentence of Ricardo Urzúa, accused of murdering several women, is coming to an end. His rehabilitation begins, and he does everything he can to become head of the guard, and is also looking for answers, as well as for his child, who knows nothing about him.

Cast 
 Eduardo Capetillo as Ricardo Urzúa Lozano
 Eduardo Capetillo Gaytán as young Ricardo Urzúa Lozano
 Itatí Cantoral as Gloria “Glorita” Carmona
 Esmeralda Pimentel as Olivia Serrano
 Iván Amozurrutia as Alfonso “Poncho” Quiroga / Alfonso Urzúa Luján / Alfonso Carrasco
 Oka Giner as Leonora Robledo
 Plutarco Haza as Hugo González Cortez / Noé Serrano Diccarey
 Manuel Alcaraz as young Hugo González Cortez
 Mauricio Hénao as Daniel “Dani” Quiroga / Daniel Urzúa Luján
 Polo Morín as Julián
 Antonio Sotillo as Alejandro Molina
 Daniel Gama Moreno as Gerardo “Gera”
 Ana Jimena Villanueva as Ana Linares
 Humberto Busto as Ángel Linares
 Nahuel Escobar as Fabio
 Rebeca Herrera as Rosário Sarmiento
 Mónica Guzmán as Penélope “Lopita”
 Giovanna Reynaud as Mayte
 José Manuel Rincón as Erick
 Everardo Arzate as Esteban
 Javier Díaz Dueñas as Eliás Solórzano
 Adrián Aguirre as Espinoza
 Tamara Mazarraza as Gaby

Episodes

References

External links
 
 

Thriller television series
Television shows filmed in Mexico
2020s Mexican television series
2022 Mexican television series debuts
Spanish-language Netflix original programming
Television series about revenge